The 2016 Missouri Southern Lions football team represented Missouri Southern State University in the 2016 NCAA Division II football season. The Lions played their home games in Fred G. Hughes Stadium in Joplin, Missouri, as they have done since 1975. 2016 was the 48th season in school history. The Lions were led by second-year head coach, Denver Johnson. Missouri Southern has been a member of the Mid-America Intercollegiate Athletics Association since 1989.

Preseason
The Lions entered the 2016 season after finishing in 11th place last season with a record of 1–10, under Johnson. On August 2, 2016 at the MIAA Football Media Day, the Lions were chosen to finish in 10th place in the Coaches Poll, and 11th in the Media Poll.

Personnel

Coaching staff
Along with Johnson, there were 9 assistants.

Roster

Schedule

Game summaries

Fort Hays State

Missouri Western

Emporia State

Northwest Missouri State

Nebraska–Kearney

Washburn

Central Missouri

Central Oklahoma

Northeastern State

Lindenwood

Pittsburg State

References

Missouri Southern
Missouri Southern Lions football seasons
Missouri Southern Lions football